Alder Creek is an approximately  long tributary of Big Tujunga Creek in Los Angeles County, California and the Angeles National Forest. It is formed by the confluence of the West Fork and North Fork Alder Creek in the San Gabriel Mountains a short distance south of Pacifico Mountain. Near its mouth the creek flows under a bridge carrying Upper Big Tujunga Canyon Road.

See also
List of rivers of California

References

Rivers of Los Angeles County, California